Conophytum breve is a small South African species of succulent plant of the genus Conophytum.

Description
Conophytum breve has small, smooth, rounded heads, and offsets to form irregular clumps. The epidermis is a chalky grey to glaucous green, without any spots or markings. It resembles very closely its relative Conophytum calculus, but is much smaller and forms more uneven clusters.

Relatives and distinguishing features
It is closely related to Conophytum pageae, with which it is often conflated. However C.breve is smaller, with more rounded heads and a more grey-green colour. It is also related to the larger species Conophytum calculus (which is much larger) and to Conophytum stevens-jonesianum (which is covered with spots).

Distribution
This species is indigenous to the Namaqualand, in the far west of the Northern Cape Province, South Africa.

It produces yellow flowers in autumn.

References

Further reading
Hammer,S.(2002) Dumpling and his wife: New views of the genus Conophytum EAE Creative Colour Ltd. .
Hammer,S.(1993) The genus Conophytum : A Conograph Succulent Plant Publications, Pretoria. .
National Botanical Institute of South Africa.(1993) List of Southern African Succulent Plants Umdaus Press.

External links

breve
Endemic flora of South Africa
Flora of the Cape Provinces
Namaqualand
Plants described in 1925
Taxa named by N. E. Brown